Bordley is a village in the Craven district of North Yorkshire, England, within the Yorkshire Dales National Park and  north of Skipton. According to the 2001 census it had a population of 23.

Bordley is mentioned as Borelaie in the Domesday Book.

Bordley was historically part of the township of Hetton with Bordley in the ancient parish of Burnsall in the West Riding of Yorkshire. In the late 19th century it became a separate township, and it became a separate civil parish in 1866. It was transferred to the new county of North Yorkshire in 1974. The civil parish was abolished in 2012 and amalgamated with the parish of Hetton to form the new civil parish of Hetton-cum-Bordley.

References

External links

Bordley history pages

Villages in North Yorkshire
Former civil parishes in North Yorkshire
Craven District